Cyclomyces is a genus of fungi in the family Hymenochaetaceae.

Species list

Cyclomyces albida
Cyclomyces beccarianus
Cyclomyces bresadolae
Cyclomyces cichoriaceus
Cyclomyces fuscus
Cyclomyces gigase
Cyclomyces greeniie
Cyclomyces iodinus
Cyclomyces lamellatus
Cyclomyces leveillei
Cyclomyces maderensis
Cyclomyces setiporus
Cyclomyces stereoides
Cyclomyces yuennanensis

Hymenochaetaceae
Agaricomycetes genera